Sir James Howe, 2nd Baronet (c. 1669 – 19 January 1736), of Berwick St Leonard, near Hindon, Wiltshire, was an English Tory politician who sat in the English and British House of Commons between 1698 and 1709. 

Howe was the son of Sir George Grobham Howe, 1st Baronet of Berwick St Leonard, and his wife Elizabeth Grimston, daughter of Sir Harbottle Grimston, 2nd Baronet. His father had been MP for Hindon. He succeeded to the baronetcy on the death of his father in 1676. He married Elizabeth Nutt, daughter of Edward Nutt of Nackington, Kent in 1689. She died in 1691 and he married as his second wife Elizabeth Stratford, daughter of Henry Stratford of Halling Gloucester in August 1694.

At the 1698 English general election, Howe was elected as Tory Member of Parliament for Hindon. He was returned at the first general election of 1701, but chose not to stand in at the second general election of that year. He was re-elected MP for Hindon at the 1702 general election and held the seat until the 1705 election when he was defeated. At the 1708 British general election he was returned again as MP for Hindon but was unseated on petition in February 1709.

Howe died without issue on 19 January 1736 aged 66. His estates were inherited by his nephew Henry Lee Warner, who had sat for Hindon from 1711 to 1713.

References

 

1660s births
1736 deaths
Baronets in the Baronetage of England
People from Wiltshire
Year of birth uncertain
English MPs 1698–1700
English MPs 1701
English MPs 1702–1705